ʿAlī ibn ʿĪsā ibn Dā'ūd ibn al-Jarrāḥ (Dayr Qunna, 859 – Baghdad, 1 August 946), was a Persian official of the Abbasid Caliphate.

Descended from a family with long history of service in the Abbasid government, he rose to power in the Abbasid court, serving as vizier in 913–917, 918–923, and 927–928.

Ali ibn Isa's political career, coinciding with the terminal decline of the Abbasid state, was turbulent, marked by a power struggle with his rival Abu'l-Hasan Ali ibn al-Furat and his supporters, resulting in frequent periods of exile. In contrast to the largesse and extravagance of Ibn al-Furat, Ali ibn Isa was austere and a determined opponent of corruption, which earned him many enemies. Nevertheless, he was later remembered as the "good vizier" for his administrative talent and honesty.

References

Sources
 
 
 
 
 

859 births
946 deaths
Viziers of the Abbasid Caliphate
People from Baghdad
9th-century Iranian politicians
10th-century Iranian politicians
10th-century people from the Abbasid Caliphate